Dimorphostylis is a genus of crustacean from the Diastylidae family. The scientific name of this species was first published in 1921 by Zimmer.

Species 
The following species are accepted within Dimorphostylis:

 Dimorphostylis acroplicata Harada, 1960
 Dimorphostylis asiatica Zimmer, 1908
 Dimorphostylis australis Foxon, 1932
 Dimorphostylis bathyelegans Akiyama, 2011
 Dimorphostylis brevicarpus Akiyama, 2011
 Dimorphostylis brevicaudata (Zimmer, 1903) 
 Dimorphostylis colefaxi Hale, 1945
 Dimorphostylis cornigera Harada, 1960
 Dimorphostylis coronata Gamo, 1960
 Dimorphostylis cottoni Hale, 1936
 Dimorphostylis echinata Gamo, 1962
 Dimorphostylis elegans Gamo, 1960
 Dimorphostylis gibbosa Harada, 1960
 Dimorphostylis hirsuta Gamo, 1960
 Dimorphostylis horai Kurian, 1956
 Dimorphostylis inauspicata Hale, 1945
 Dimorphostylis latifrons Harada, 1960
 Dimorphostylis longicauda Gamo, 1962
 Dimorphostylis longitelson Kurian, 1963
 Dimorphostylis maledivensis Mühlenhardt-Siegel, 1996
 Dimorphostylis manazuruensis Gamo, 1960
 Dimorphostylis namhaedoensis Lin & Lee, 2002
 Dimorphostylis nordaustraliana Gerken, 2014
 Dimorphostylis quadriplicata Gamo, 1960
 Dimorphostylis roccatagliatai Gerken, 2014
 Dimorphostylis sculpturensis Vassilenko & Tzareva, 1990
 Dimorphostylis subaculeata Hale, 1945
 Dimorphostylis tasmanica Hale, 1945
 Dimorphostylis tribulis Hale, 1945
 Dimorphostylis triplicata Gerken, 2014
 Dimorphostylis valida Harada, 1960
 Dimorphostylis vieta (Hale, 1936)

References

Cumacea
Crustacean genera